Barbarians is a 2020 German historical war drama television series created by Andreas Heckmann, Arne Nolting, and Jan Martin Scharf. It stars Laurence Rupp, Jeanne Goursaud, and David Schütter. The series is a fictional account of events during the Roman Empire's occupation of Germania, and the resulting rebellion of the Germanic tribes led by Arminius. The series was renewed for season 2 on November 10, 2020. It was released on Netflix on October 21, 2022.

Plot 
The story takes place during the Roman occupation of  Germania Magna (an area between the Rhine river and the Elbe) in the latter part of 9 AD. The Romans had occupied the region for twenty years, and the Germanic tribes are oppressed by the empire's heavy taxes and demands for tribute. Attempts to form a unified Germanic resistance are hampered by petty in-fighting between the tribal chieftains, and the selfish aspirations of certain tribesmen desiring peace with Rome.

Arminius, an eques in the Roman Imperial army, is a member of the Germanic Cherusci tribe who was given away as a hostage to Rome when he was a child, along with his younger brother Flavus, by his father Segimer to ensure peace between his tribe and Rome. He returns to Germania to help Publius Quinctilius Varus (his foster father) maintain order in the region. Upon seeing the atrocities inflicted by Roman soldiers on his former people, he becomes the new chieftain of the Cherusci tribe, and ignites a rebellion by finally uniting the tribes with the help of Thusnelda (daughter of Segestes) and Folkwin Wolfspeer, his two best friends during childhood. These events eventually culminate on the date of September 11, 9 AD in a massive ambush of three Roman legions (some 15,000 men) at the Battle of the Teutoburg Forest, where the Germanic people emerge victorious. Faced with humiliating defeat and shocked by the treason of his adopted son, Varus commits suicide.

Cast 
 	as Arminius
  as Thusnelda
 David Schütter as Folkwin Wolfspeer
 Bernhard Schütz as Segestes
 Nicki von Tempelhoff as Segimer
 Ronald Zehrfeld as Berulf
 Eva Verena Müller as Irmina
 Nikolai Kinski as Pelagios
  as Metellus
 Gaetano Aronica as Varus
 Urs Rechn as Kunolf the Brukteer
 Mathis Landwehr as Eigil
 Jeremy Miliker as Ansgar
  as Hadgan
 Matthias Weidenhöfer as Golmad
 Florian Schmidtke as Talio
 Denis Schmidt as Rurik
 Sophie Rois as Seeress Runa
 Arved Birnbaum as Albarich

Production and background
The shooting took place in Budapest from August 12 to November 30, 2019. The series was produced by the German Gaumont GmbH, a subsidiary of the French Gaumont (producers Sabine de Mardt, Andreas Bareiss, and Ranier Marquass.)

Christian Stassinger was in charge of the camera.  Esther Walz was responsible for costume design, Thomas Stammer for the production design and Iris Baumuller for the casting.  The first four episodes were staged by Austrian director , and the final two episodes directed by Irishman Steve St. Leger, who had also worked on Vikings.
During the production, the makers of the television series took advice from historians.

At the start of the series, Netflix advertised in Bielefeld with the text Nobody conquers the Teutoburg Forest. This is an allusion to the chants by DSC Arminia Bielefeld.  Arminus is the namesake of the football club.

Reception
Thomas Grueter judged in the science portal Spektrum that the overall impression of the series remains ambivalent. "It vividly shows the two irreconcilable cultures. The Latin dialogues of the Romans are a highlight. Costumes, props and buildings were very well done, the equipment of the Roman legionaries corresponded to historical reality, and the Germanic longhouses looked amazingly authentic. Despite some weaknesses, the series is exciting and worth seeing if you don't make too many demands on the historical accuracy of the plot."

For Forbes, film historian Sheena Scott rated Barbarians as "an excellent series that reveals a key historical event in Europe through a gripping tale of love, friendship, betrayal and revenge" and praised the "excellent production design, great performances, especially the main trio Jeanne Goursaud, David Schütter and Laurence Rupp, and the wonderful cinematography of the series."

Journalist Andreas Fischer of the Weser-Kurier remarked that the "biggest dilemma was the supposed historicity of the series. In the cloak of a history lesson, this half-knowledge spreads, the historical background is reduced to a few key facts and only serves as a legitimization for the German variant of the mixture of love, violence and Norse mythology that has been in fashion since Game of Thrones and Vikings.

The expectation that paid streaming services like Netflix have to stand out from the evening entertainment program is not fulfilled for the journalist Ambros Waibel from the newspaper Taz with Barbarians.  The series remains, "apart from a bit of clean nudity here and a few dirty beheadings there, stuck in a Germany as a 'Terra X'-Rubbish and is therefore as superfluous as a Suebian knot."  Waibel sees the entertainment aspect neglected and instead cites a "contemporary sword-and-sandal film" as a reference point in the genre of The Eagle.'

Archaeologist Matthias Wemhoff in the Frankfurter Allgemeine Zeitung criticized the depiction of Germania, shown in the agriculture, as a "dark, impenetrable forest landscape" as well as a cliched impression of a "rough, linguistically completely ignorant" rural society, which reflects the "complex canon of behavior in a group that has been relatively firmly established over centuries" as not fair. Prehistorian Karl Banghard, also in the FAZ, opined that the series "had little to do with the everyday history of the 'turning point; specifically, he complained about the numerous historical inaccuracies, for example in relation to nutrition and clothing, but above all the distribution of roles between the "imperialist Romans against the indigenous Germans." The series tells "the story of the great ethnic resistance struggle" and "mindlessly rehashes the national historical narratives of the 19th Century."
 
At the start of the series, journalist and archaeologist Sascha Priester illuminated the historical background of the Varus events. He called for a clear distinction between cinema "in the imagination", fiction and what can be really considered scientifically proven today. The general idea of the "Varus battle"with ambushes, entrenchments or a contiguous battlefieldmust be questioned again and again.  Due to the constantly new archaeological findings from the Fund region of Kalkriese, a presumed scene of the events, this picture will be continuously changed, enriched and refined. On the occasion of the first season release, he exchanged views in the SWR2-Forum with Heidrun Derks, Reinhard Wolters and moderator Gregor Papschout.  The group discussed the conflict within the protagonist Arminius and the confrontation between the tribes and the great power Rome, the genre of the weak versus the strong. The experts agreed that the series wants to entertain, but largely avoids the false historic pathos and the historical term 'Germanic peoples' is skillfully circumnavigated.  For the scientific understanding of the term "barbarians", Sascha Priester noted the possible ambiguous understanding of the series title for some viewers, who think less archaeologically and historically, but above all judge and evaluate the character of the people playing: "Who are the barbarians of this series? Because the Romans, the supposed bearers of civilization, are very violent and barbaric."

In the first four weeks of the release of the episodes, more than 37 million households watched the series.

Episodes

Series overview

Season 1 (2020)

Season 2 (2022)

References

External links
 
 
 

2020 German television series debuts
2020s German drama television series
Latin-language television
German-language Netflix original programming
Television shows set in Germany
Roman Empire in art and culture
Television series set in the 1st century
Cultural depictions of Arminius
Television series by Gaumont International Television